Prairie Valley High School was a public high school located in Gowrie, Iowa. It offers a curriculum for students in grades 9–12. It was a part of the Prairie Valley Community School District.

In August 2014 the Prairie Valley district began a whole grade-sharing arrangement with the Southeast Webster-Grand Community School District as a way to deal with smaller enrollments and as a way to save money. The two districts together share middle and high schools. The combined Southeast Valley High School is in the former Prairie Valley building.

Mission
Prairie Valley High School provides students with the opportunity to acquire skills and knowledge to allow them to become productive and responsible citizens.

Curriculum

Goals
The school has set the following goals:
At the end of each academic year, all students will either graduate or continue their education with graduation as their goal.
By the school year 2013-2014 all students will be proficient in math, reading and science as measured by ITED testing of grade 11.

Courses
In addition to standard high school courses, the school offers:
Agriculture Education
Art
Computer Education
Family and Consumer Science
Industrial Arts
Online College Classes

Extracurricular activities

Music
The school has a Jazz band, Concert band, Marching band, Color Guard, Mixed chorus and Swing choir. The students stage a musical and a spring play each year.

Sports
The school sponsors interscholastic teams in Boys Basketball, Boys Cross Country, Boys Golf, Boys Track, Cheerleading, Football, Girls Basketball, Girls Cross Country, Girls Golf, Girls Soccer,  Girls Track, Softball, Baseball, Sports Ambassadors, Volleyball and Wrestling. They compete in the Iowa-Twin Lakes Conference and the Iowa High School Athletic Association.

Jag Café
At the school's Jag Café, students in the Sourheast Valley Foods III class are involved in a project where students plan menus, grocery shop, prepare and serve meals.

Weightlifting 
At school, there is weightlifting to help you get better physically and in sports. Most of the time, it is before school, sometimes it is after school.

Other activities
The school's Dance team, Mock Trial team, and Speech team compete against other schools in organized tournaments.

References

External links
Prairie Valley Community School District High School is a sub-page  (requires Internet Explorer)
School review
GreatSchools - Prairie Valley High School
Education Bug - Prairie Valley High School

Public high schools in Iowa
Schools in Webster County, Iowa